Cornelius O'Callaghan may refer to:

 Cornelius O'Callaghan (died 1742), Irish politician, MP for Fethard (Tipperary) 1723–1714
 Cornelius O'Callaghan (1712–1781), Irish politician, MP for Fethard (Tipperary) 1761–1768, for Newtownards
 Cornelius O'Callaghan, 1st Baron Lismore (1741–1797), Irish politician and peer, MP for Fethard, Tipperary 1768–1785
 Cornelius O'Callaghan, 1st Viscount Lismore (1775–1857), Irish peer and privy counsellor, MP for Lostwithiel 1806–1807
 Cornelius O'Callaghan (1809–1849), Irish politician, MP for Tipperary 1832–1835
 Cornelius O'Callaghan (Fianna Fáil politician) (1922–1974), Fianna Fáil senator 1970–1974